Robert Bonney may refer to:

 Robert Earl Bonney (1882–1967), U.S. Navy sailor and Medal of Honor recipient
 Robert Bonney (gymnast) (1884–1951), British gymnast